Dharmapuri Jaavali Subbarayar was a composer of Carnatic music who lived during the nineteenth century. He composed mainly in the Telugu language and used Dharmapuri, the name of his birthplace and a city in Tamil Nadu, as his mudra.

Compositions

External links
 Karnatic.com biography

See also
 List of Carnatic composers

Year of birth missing
Year of death missing
Carnatic composers